Blitz Wolf is a 1942 American animated propaganda short film produced and distributed by Metro-Goldwyn-Mayer. A parody of the Three Little Pigs told via a World War II perspective, the short was directed by Tex Avery (in his first cartoon for MGM) and produced by Fred Quimby. It was nominated for the Academy Award for Best Short Subject: Cartoons but lost to Der Fuehrer's Face, another anti-Nazi World War II parody featuring Donald Duck.

Plot
The plot is a parody of the Three Little Pigs, told from a Second World War anti-German propaganda perspective. In this cartoon, the danger is from  Adolf Wolf (Adolf Hitler), who is set on invading the pig's nation of Pigmania. The pig who built his house of stone, "Sergeant Pork" (an homage to Sergeant York), take his precautions and outfits his house with defense machinery, but the two pigs who built their houses of straw and sticks claim they don't have to take precautions against the wolf because they signed a non-aggression pact with him.

Adolf Wolf invades Pigmania, despite the two pigs protesting that he signed a treaty with them. He destroys their houses, the straw house with "Der Mechanized Huffer Und Puffer" and the stick house with an artillery shell, forcing the pigs to take shelter in the third pig's house, prompting a battle between the two parties. Towards the end of the cartoon, Adolf Wolf is blown out of his bomber plane by the pigs' artillery shells, fired from their multi-barreled "secret weapon" and filled with Defense bonds, and plummets down to Earth followed by a bomb from his own plane, which promptly blows him to Hell upon impact. There he realizes he is dead and says: "Where am I? Have I been blown to... ?", whereupon a group of devils adds: "Ehhhh, it's a possibility!", in reference to a then well-known catchphrase by Artie Auerbach on the Al Pearce radio show.

Voice cast
Bill Thompson as Adolf Wolf (uncredited)
Pinto Colvig as Sgt. Pork (uncredited)
Frank Graham as narrator (uncredited)
Sara Berner as pigs (uncredited)
Kent Rogers as devils (uncredited)

Cultural references

This is Tex Avery's first cartoon at MGM, and also the first film at MGM for animator Ed Love. Love had arrived at MGM with Kenneth Muse just after the 1941 Disney animators' strike.
The MGM lion, Tanner, roars to the tune of "Hold That Tiger", with 5 quick and short roars. Same background music of "Hold That Tiger" occurs in Rudolf Ising's Chips Off the Old Block (1942) start. 21 days (3 weeks) differ among their dates. This film, Tex Avery's Blitz Wolf (1942) was first, Saturday, August 22, 1942 and Rudolf Ising's Chips Off the Old Block (1942), was second on Saturday, September 12, 1942. Adolf Wolf, the antagonist of the cartoon, would serve as inspiration for Tex Avery's unnamed wolf, who would appear in other cartoons such as Red Hot Riding Hood and Northwest Hounded Police.
Tex Avery would once again parody the story of the Three Little Pigs in One Ham's Family and The Three Little Pups.
This short was widely available, uncut, on the MGM/UA video label's VHS release, Tex Avery's Screwball Classics, Vol. 4 and on the MGM/UA laserdisc collection The Compleat Tex Avery. A fully restored and uncut version is available on Academy Awards Animation Collection DVD set by Warner Home Video, and as a bonus feature (in standard definition) on Disc 3 of the Looney Tunes Platinum Collection: Volume 2 Blu-Ray set. The high definition version was later included on the Tex Avery Screwball Classics: Volume 3 Blu-Ray by Warner Archive Collection.
There is a reference to the Doolittle Raid by Jimmy Doolittle on Tokyo. When the bomb lands and destroys Tokyo, there is a sign "Doolittle Dood It!" coming out from the water. "Doolittle Dood It!" was an actual newspaper headline of the Los Angeles Herald Examiner.
Pinto Colvig provides the voice of "Practical Pig", as he did in Disney's Three Little Pigs.
Adolf Wolf's voice was provided by Bill Thompson, who would later voice Droopy. Droopy starred in his own adaptation of the story called The Three Little Pups.
In the beginning, the two little pigs mockingly sing to Sergeant Pork: You're in the Army Now,/ You're Not Behind the Plow,/ You're Diggin' a Ditch,/ [pause and motion freeze],/ You're in the Army Now! The pause was inserted to replace the line "You Son of a Bitch", which would be inappropriate for a film at the time. This is much similar to a gag in the Warner Bros. cartoon The Draft Horse.
The wolf saying "Is that you Mert?" on the phone is a reference to the radio show Fibber McGee and Molly.
Most of the scenery doesn't resemble World War II at all. The trenches and the pigs' uniforms resemble those of World War I.
As the tanks arrive, one small tank has the line "Good Humor" written on its side and makes the sound of an ice cream truck. This is similar to a joke later used in Bugs Bunny Nips the Nips.
A lone flame tank not spewing fire holds up a sign with the line 'I Don't Want to Set the World on Fire'.
When the straw house is blown away, a sign says 'Gone with the Wind', referring to the 1939 film (with another smaller sign agreeing that this is a corny gag), which was also released by MGM.
One of the pigs' artillery shells blasts the Wolf's tank into tin cans, a reference to the Allied Scrap Metal Drives of World War II.
At one point, Sgt. Pork distracts incoming shellfire by holding up a copy of Esquire magazine's (unseen-by-the-audience) Petty Girl pin-up artwork by George Petty.

Analysis
Out of 15 cartoon shorts released by the Metro-Goldwyn-Mayer cartoon studio in 1942, this was the only one to have World War II as its subject matter. Besides targeting Adolf Hitler, the short includes references to Anti-Japanese sentiment in the United States.
The Wolf holds a sign inviting the audience to hiss at him, as nobody cares about their reaction. This breaks the fourth wall and reveals the character's contempt for the audience.

There is a mixed message regarding the characters. The Wolf is a sociopath with enough panache to keep the audience interested in him. Conversely, Sergeant Pork is a humorless, stoic character who fails to stand out.

The MGM pressbook termed the short as pro-democracy propaganda. The two lazy pig brothers reject preparation for defense because of their non-aggression pact, an allusion to the Molotov–Ribbentrop Pact. Their brother Sgt. Pork is named after Sgt. Alvin C. York, a World War I hero who inspired the film Sergeant York (1941). He represents the attitude of preparing for war.

The Wolf violates a non-aggression pact to blow down the pigs' homes. The two lazy pigs become fugitives of war and seek asylum in their brother's fortified home. Said home demonstrates a sign: "No Japs allowed". The three pigs use a huge cannon to bomb Tokyo. The city is destroyed with the image of the Rising Sun Flag collapsing in the background, replaced by a sky with red, white and blue stripes.

During the showdown, the Wolf fires an artillery shell against the fortified house. Sgt. Pork in his trench reaches down for his copy of the Esquire magazine. The pig opens the magazine and shows the centerfold to the shell. The shell stops in midflight and whistles in appreciation. It then retreats and returns with ten other shells. This group of friends are fascinated by the image presented to them. They make catcall sounds and then fall down de-activated. The pinup here is used as more than a talisman for boosting morale. It exploits the male vulnerability of the enemy through eliciting erotic arousal. The shells stand-in for their human operators.

In another scene where a weapon stands-in for military personnel, Pork's cannon collapses exhausted. Its owner revives it through feeding it B-1 vitamins. (B1 helps the body generate energy.) The cannon stands erect again, a phallic image, and begins blasting away all on its own. The label may reference the number system of military hardware like the Boeing B-17 Flying Fortress.

The Wolf utilizes a "Stinka Bomber PU". This is a parody of the German Stuka, a dive bomber used by the Luftwaffe. The shells that down the aircraft are filled with defense bonds. The cartoon concludes with two printed titles: "The end of Adolf" and "If you'll Buy a Stamp or Bond- We'll Skin that Skunk Across the Pond!"

According to Chuck Jones, Tex Avery was criticized by an MGM producer for being overly rough in his depiction of Hitler. The producer reminded Avery that the victor of the war was yet to be determined.

This cartoon has rarely been shown in the United States since World War II. However, it was shown on Cartoon Network's ToonHeads and TCM's Cartoon Alley with the word "Japs" airbrushed out from the "No Japs Allowed" sign, and the scene involving a missile hitting Tokyo cut (this edited version is also available on the Region 2 Tex Avery 5-disc DVD set).

Availability
VHS
Tex Avery's Screwball Classics 4
LaserDisc
All This and Tex Avery Too!
The Compleat Tex Avery
DVD
Warner Bros. Home Entertainment Academy Awards Animation Collection: 15 Winners, 26 Nominees
Blu-ray
Looney Tunes Platinum Collection: Volume 2, Disc 3
Tex Avery Screwball Classics: Volume 3

See also
The Thrifty Pig (a 1941 short by Disney, also involving the Three Little Pigs against a nazi wolf)
List of World War II short films

References

Sources

External links

Screenshots and commentary on Classic Cartoons

1942 films
1942 animated films
1942 short films
1940s American animated films
1940s animated short films
1942 comedy films
Animated films about wolves
Metro-Goldwyn-Mayer animated short films
Self-reflexive films
Cultural depictions of Adolf Hitler
American World War II propaganda shorts
Films directed by Tex Avery
Films set in a fictional country
Films set in Germany
Films based on The Three Little Pigs
Films based on fairy tales
Films about pigs
American parody films
Fairy tale parody films
Animation based on real people
Metro-Goldwyn-Mayer films
Films scored by Scott Bradley
Films set in hell
Tex Avery's Big Bad Wolf films
Films produced by Fred Quimby
Metro-Goldwyn-Mayer cartoon studio short films
1940s English-language films